A tiki torch is a pole-mounted torch, typically made of bamboo, that originated in the tiki culture of the mid-20th-century United States, which has increased in popularity and spread to other places as a popular party decoration with a tropical island aesthetic. Though early mass-produced torches were made of aluminum or other metals, the most familiar style of tiki torch consists of a bamboo stick with a container of flammable fluid at the top, and then a lit wick drawing from that container.

History 
Tiki culture originated in the 1930s in California, at Polynesian-themed bars and restaurants like Don's Beachcomber in Los Angeles, which featured flaming torches fueled by propane gas as part of its decor. Torches, both gas and electric, became one of the hallmarks of the "tiki bars" that opened across the country in the following decades, and of the tiki culture that grew out of them.

In the 1950s, a company in Wisconsin began producing aluminum torches for consumer use, obtaining a trademark for the "Tiki Torch" name. Tiki Brand, owned by W. C. Bradley Co. subsidiary Lamplight Farms, continues to produce its namesake torches, though other companies produce similar products that are also colloquially referred to as "tiki torches."

Popular materials used in manufacturing modern tiki torches include bamboo and metal. While tiki torches are usually intended as temporary fixtures, some are designed for permanent installation and may be connected to gas pipes for fuel. Citronella oil is used in some tiki torches to serve both as fuel for the flame and as insect repellent.

Horticultural use 
The name "tiki torch" has been borrowed as a nickname for Canna compacta.

See also
 Outdoor lighting
 Polynesian culture
Outdoor candle

References

External links 
 

Torches
Torch